Hallstatt is a housing development in the town of Luoyang located in Boluo County within the city of Huizhou, Guangdong, China. Its urban core is modelled after the small town of Hallstatt in Austria, a World Heritage Site. The center of the area contains a replica of the parish church, the fountain and various other objects from the original Hallstatt town centre. 

The housing project was built by the China Minmetals Ltd., a wholly owned Hong Kong-listed subsidiary of China's largest steel and mining company, China Minmetals Corp. The name officially used by the operator is "Hallstatt See - Huizhou".

Transport links 

Hallstatt See is located in the economic region of the Pearl River Delta, in the prefecture of Huizhou and here directly in front of the city of Huizhou. Due to the direct affiliation to the city of Huizhou and its infrastructure network, it can also be reached consciously from the nearby southern Chinese economic metropolises such as Guangzhuo, Shenzhen or Hong Kong. Huizhou has an airport, highways and high-speed trains. 6 pairs of high speed trains have been in service for passengers travelling from Hong Kong to Huizhou or from to Hong Kong.
Most of these bullet trains start from Shenzhen North railway station, and only 4 start from Futian railway station. In the other side, most of them arrive at Huizhou South railway station, and a few arrive at Huidong railway station. About 20 normal trains are also operated on this route. It takes them 1.5-2 hours to finish the journey.

Reception in Austria 

Hallstatt's mayor Alexander Scheutz first heard about the plans to build a replica of his town in 2011. At that point, the construction was already in an advanced state.

While parts of the Hallstatt population viewed the Chinese plans with scepticism, Scheutz said that he saw a chance in the project for the tourism in the "original" Hallstatt. He personally visited the opening ceremony in 2012 and signed an agreement for cultural exchange.

Similar projects in China 
The construction of Hallstatt is part of a trend in China to mimic or rebuild other parts of the world. While this is one of only a few examples where a whole town layout has been partly replicated (the second being Venice), there are many similar places in China. Other examples include a copy of the Eiffel Tower in Tianducheng and several copies of European castles in Chongqing. For other portions of whole cities replicated in China, there is a Manhattan in Tianjin (Yujiapu Financial District) and a copy of Jackson Hole, Wyoming, in Hebei province (Jackson Hole, China). There is also a replica of Venice in Dalian, Liaoning province, which freezes over in winter.

Many of these copycat cities are housing developments for the wealthier Chinese population.

See also 
 Thames Town
 Jackson Hole, China
 Europe Street
 Ju Jun

References

Boluo County
Replica constructions in China